Stephen Barker House is a historic house at 165 Haverhill Street in Methuen, Massachusetts.

Built in 1839, it is one of several handsome houses built at the periphery of the Methuen settlement in the mid-19th Century, and remains a well conserved "country Residence". Reportedly, surveyor Stephen Barker built "Woodland Cottage" in imitation of antebellum mansions he had seen in the South.

Barker, from one of Methuen's original families, had gone to seek his fortune in Tennessee and sent home enough money to build a house. The old farm house was moved and on its site was built this imitation of a Southern mansion.  The details of the house, such as the entrance, the Doric columns and frieze board above, classify it as Greek Revival.  The builder freely adapted traditional elements: rows of dormers, triangular windows in the gable end, and railing above the porch mimicking gingerbread fretwork.

It was added to the National Historic Register in 1984.

See also
 National Register of Historic Places listings in Methuen, Massachusetts

References

Houses in Methuen, Massachusetts
Houses completed in 1839
National Register of Historic Places in Methuen, Massachusetts
Houses on the National Register of Historic Places in Essex County, Massachusetts